The Walton family is an American family whose collective fortune derived from Walmart makes them the richest family in the United States of America.

Overview
The three most prominent living members (Jim, Rob, and Alice Walton) have consistently been in the top twenty of the Forbes 400 list since 2001, as were John ( 2005) and Helen (d. 2007) prior to their deaths. Christy Walton took her husband John's place in the ranking after his death.  The majority of the family's wealth derives from the heritage of Bud and Sam Walton, who were the co-founders of Walmart.  Walmart is the world's largest retailer, one of the world's largest business enterprises in terms of annual revenue, and, with just over 2.2 million employees, the world's largest private employer.

, the Waltons collectively owned 50.8 percent of Walmart. In 2018, the family sold some of their company's stock and now owns just under 50%. In January 19, the Walton family's net worth was around US$240.6 billion.

Walton Family Foundation 
In 1987, Sam Walton endowed a charitable foundation.  The Walton Family Foundation primarily focused on charter schools, but it later extended its program to include environmental issues, particularly water-related.

In 2016, Alice and Jim Walton put a $250 million grant towards building charter school facilities. The Walton Family Foundation created the Building Equity Initiative to provide charter schools with access to capital to create and expand their facilities. This initiative was established after the foundation announced in 2016 that it would spend $1 billion over the next five years to expand "educational opportunity" by partnering with charter school operators, researchers, and education reformers.

Walton family fortune 

The Walton family fortune is broken down as such:
 Jim Walton, $66.9 billion
Alice Walton, $66 billion
 S. Robson Walton, $65.7 billion
 Lukas Walton, $16.7 billion
 Ann Walton Kroenke, $9.1 billion
 Nancy Walton Laurie, $8.2 billion
 Christy Walton, $8 billion

Family tree 

Their immediate family includes Jim, Christy, and Lukas Walton.

References 

 
American billionaires
American businesspeople in retailing
American families
Business families of the United States
Presbyterian families